The Pine Tar Incident (also known as the Pine Tar Game) was a controversial incident in  during an American League baseball game played between the Kansas City Royals and New York Yankees at Yankee Stadium in New York City on Sunday, July 24, 1983.

With his team trailing 4–3 in the top half of the ninth inning and two out, the Royals' future Hall of Fame third baseman George Brett hit a two-run home run off of Rich "Goose" Gossage (also a future Hall of Famer) to give his team the lead; however, Yankees manager Billy Martin, who had noticed a large amount of pine tar on Brett's bat, requested that the umpires inspect his bat. The umpires ruled that the amount on the bat exceeded that allowed by rule, nullified Brett's home run, and called him out. As Brett was the third out in the ninth inning with the home team in the lead, the game ended with a Yankees win.

The Royals protested the game, upheld by American League president Lee MacPhail, who ordered that the game be continued from the point of Brett's home run. The game was resumed 25 days later on August 18, and officially ended with the Royals winning .

Incident

The visiting Royals were trailing 4–3 with two outs in the top of the ninth in a game being played at New York's Yankee Stadium.  With U L Washington on first base George Brett came to the plate and reliever Dale Murray was replaced by closer Rich "Goose" Gossage. After fouling off the first pitch to the left, Brett connected on a high strike and put it well into the right field stands for a two-run home run and a 5–4 lead.

As Brett crossed the plate, however, New York manager Billy Martin approached rookie home plate umpire Tim McClelland and requested Brett's bat be examined. Before the game, Martin and other members of the Yankees had noticed the excessive pine tar used by Brett, but Martin had chosen not to say anything until it was strategically useful to do so. Yankees third baseman Graig Nettles recalled a similar incident involving Thurman Munson in a  game against the Minnesota Twins. In Nettles' autobiography Balls, Nettles claims that he actually informed Martin of the pine tar rule, as Nettles had previously undergone the same scrutiny with his own bat while with the Twins.

With Brett watching from the dugout, McClelland and the rest of the umpiring crew, Drew Coble, Joe Brinkman, and Nick Bremigan, inspected the bat. Because of this, the crew determined that Brett's home run constituted an "illegally batted ball," and under the terms of the then-existing provisions of Rule 6.06, any batter who hit an illegally batted ball was automatically called out. The umpires concluded that Brett's home run was disallowed under this interpretation, and he was out, thus ending the game.

McClelland searched for Brett in the visitors' dugout, pointed at him with the bat, and signaled that he was out, handing the Yankees a 4–3 win. An enraged Brett ran out of the dugout and confronted McClelland, requiring him to be physically restrained by his manager Dick Howser, several of his teammates, and crew chief Joe Brinkman. Despite the furious protests of Brett and Howser, McClelland's ruling stood.

Protest and reversal

The Royals protested the game. Four days later, American League president Lee MacPhail upheld the Royals' protest. In explaining his decision, MacPhail noted that the "spirit of the restriction" on pine tar on bats was based not on the fear of unfair advantage, but simple economics; any contact with pine tar would discolor the ball, render it unsuitable for play, and require that it be discarded and replaced—thus increasing the home team's cost of supplying balls for a given game. MacPhail ruled that Brett had not violated the spirit of the rules nor deliberately "altered [the bat] to improve the distance factor".

MacPhail's ruling followed his own precedent established after a protest in 1975 of the September 7 game played between the Royals and the California Angels. In that game, the umpiring crew had declined to negate one of John Mayberry's home runs for excessive pine tar use. MacPhail upheld the umpires' decision with the interpretation that the intent of the rule was to prevent baseballs from being discolored during game play and that any discoloration that may have occurred to a ball leaving the ballpark did not affect the game's competitive balance.

MacPhail thus restored Brett's home run and ordered the game resumed with two outs in the top of the ninth inning with the Royals leading 5–4. However, he retroactively ejected Brett for his outburst against McClelland, along with Howser and coach Rocky Colavito for arguing with the umpires, and Royals pitcher Gaylord Perry for giving the bat to the bat boy so he could hide it in the clubhouse away from officials.

Conclusion

Strategic maneuvering
After ordering the resumption of play, MacPhail and other league officials held a strategy session to anticipate tricks the Yankees might use to prevent the game from continuing, which included the possibility the Yankees might claim Brett or Washington missed a base, automatically ruling them out, and, depending on which, preventing one or both runs from scoring.

Indeed, the Yankees resisted the resumption of the game, and hoped to forestall doing so until near the end of the season to agree to it, to see if the game would have an effect on the standings or should be forfeited.  Instead, the game was scheduled for 25 days after its suspension, to be resumed on August 18, 1983.

Legal battle
For the resumption of the game, the Yankees announced that they would charge non-season-ticket holders a $2.50 admission fee (equivalent to $0 in ) to attend. Two lawsuits were filed against the Yankees and Bronx Supreme Court (trial court) Justice Orest Maresca issued an injunction, also requested by the Yankees, preventing the game from being resumed until the lawsuits were litigated. Maresca also cited the Yankees' expressed concerns about security problems resulting from confusion over admission to the game.

That injunction was immediately appealed by the American League and was overturned by Supreme Court Appellate Division Justice Joseph Sullivan, who issued the extremely short and simple decision of "Play ball." The Royals, who were in flight during that day's legal battles, did not know that the game would be played until they arrived at Newark Airport.

The Yankees finally agreed to allow admission for the game's conclusion to anybody with a ticket stub from the July 24 game at no additional charge.

Resumption of play
August 18 had been a scheduled off-day for both teams.  The Royals landed at Newark Airport in New Jersey.  Brett did not accompany the team.  Instead, he departed directly for Baltimore, where the Royals were scheduled to play the next day—although other sources indicate Brett waited for the rest of the team, passing the time playing hearts.

The game was resumed from the point of Brett's home run, with about 1,200 fans in attendance.  A still-furious Martin made what some initially construed as a mere symbolic protest of continuing the game by putting ace starter Ron Guidry in center field (actually Guidry's second big-league appearance in center; he had played an inning there in 1979) and first baseman Don Mattingly at second base. Actually, the Gold Glove fielding Mattingly was replacing the second baseman from the July 24 game, Bert Campaneris, who was injured, and Guidry replaced original center-fielder Jerry Mumphrey, who had been traded on August 10 to the Houston Astros.  With Mattingly set to lead off the bottom of the ninth, the move allowed the substitution of another powerful batter (Ken Griffey) to play first base, and made the Yankees' top starter available to pitch if needed, all while avoiding "wast[ing] a possible pinch hitter or runner."

Mattingly became a rare Major League left-handed second baseman; no left-hander had played second base or shortstop in a big-league game since Cleveland Indians left-handed pitcher Sam McDowell was switched from pitcher to second base for one batter in a game in  against the Washington Senators in order to avoid facing right-handed Senators slugger Frank Howard.

Before the first pitch to Hal McRae (who followed Brett in the lineup), Yankee pitcher George Frazier threw the first ball to first base to challenge Brett's home run on the grounds that Brett had not touched first base. Umpire Tim Welke (given incorrectly in some sources as Tim McClelland, the original home plate umpire) called safe, even though he had not officiated the July 24 game and seen Brett touch the bases. Frazier then threw to second, claiming that the base was touched by neither Brett nor U L Washington, the other player scoring on the home run, but umpire Dave Phillips signaled safe.

Martin went on the field to protest, and Phillips, chief of the new crew, pulled out a notarized statement, produced by MacPhail's administrative assistant Bob Fishel, signed by all four umpires from July 24 indicating that Brett had touched every base. Fishel had anticipated that Martin would protest the base touching and the umpires' personal knowledge of it.  Martin claimed to be surprised by the statement because he had spoken by telephone to the first base umpire from July 24, Drew Coble, who had said that he wasn't looking at first base when Brett had circled first base. As he exited, the umpires announced that the game was being played under protest by the Yankees.

Frazier struck out Hal McRae to end the top of the ninth, 25 days after the inning began. Royals' closer Dan Quisenberry retired New York in order for the save - Mattingly flying to center, Roy Smalley flying to left, and Oscar Gamble (pinch hitting for Ron Guidry) grounded to second - preserving the Royals' 5–4 win.

The loss placed the Yankees in fifth place, three and a half games out of first. Neither team advanced to the postseason.

Quisenberry gained his league-leading 33rd save, while Mattingly lost a 25-game hitting streak.

Aftermath
The bat is currently on display in the Baseball Hall of Fame, where it has been since 1987. During a broadcast of Mike & Mike in the Morning, ESPN analyst Tim Kurkjian stated that Brett used the bat for a few games after the incident until being cautioned that the bat would be worthless if broken. Brett sold the bat to famed collector and then-partial owner of the Yankees, Barry Halper, for $25,000 (equivalent to $ in ), had second thoughts, repurchased the bat for the same amount, and then donated the bat to the Hall of Fame.

The home-run ball was caught by journalist Ephraim Schwartz, who sold it and his game ticket stub to Halper for $500 (equivalent to $ in ) plus 12 Yankees tickets. Halper also acquired the signed business card of Justice Orest V. Maresca, who had issued the injunction, and the can of Oriole Pine Tar Brett had used on the bat. Gossage later signed the pine-tar ball, "Barry, I threw the fucking thing".
The winning pitcher for the Royals was reliever Mike Armstrong, who went 10–7 that year in 58 appearances, notching career highs in wins and games. Armstrong said in a 2006 interview that, as the Royals were leaving for the airport after the resumed game, an angry Yankees fan threw a brick from an overpass at Kansas City's bus, cracking its windshield.

"It was wild to go back to New York and play these four outs in a totally empty stadium," Armstrong said in 2006. "I'm dressed in the uniform, and nobody's there."

Before a game against the Yankees at Kauffman Stadium on May 5, 2012, the Royals gave each fan who attended the game a replica baseball bat designed to look like the one Brett used with the pine tar.

As part of the Royals' fiftieth season in 2018, before a game against the Yankees at Kauffman Stadium on May 19, the Royals gave 18,000 fans who attended the game a George Brett Pine Tar bobblehead to celebrate the incident and Royals victory. It depicts Brett, after his home run was nullified, rushing at the umpires in anger.

In , Major League Baseball amended the official rules with a comment on rule 1.10(c) clarifying the consequences of using excessive pine tar on a bat. The comment codifies the interpretation of the rule issued by McPhail in his reversal:

If no objections are raised prior to a bat’s use, then a violation of Rule 1.10(c) on that play does not nullify any action or play on the field and no protests of such play shall be allowed.

Scoring

Game results

Box score 

Goose Gossage faced one batter in the top of the 9th inning.

In popular culture
In 1983, folk and "hillbilly" artist Red River Dave McEnery released "The Pine-Tarred Bat (The Ballad of George Brett)" on Longhorn Records.

Country music artist C. W. McCall dedicated the 1985 song "Pine Tar Wars" to the event, composing a lyric that features an accurate telling of the relevant facts of the story. The lyric is strongly critical of Billy Martin, referring to him as "Tar Baby Billy".

See also

References

Further reading
  "The bat boy tells his version of the pine-tar tale involving George Brett and the Yankees." 
 The radio version of the story, featuring an interview with the batboy, Merritt Riley.

External links
 Box score of the Pine Tar Game at Baseball Almanac
 Box score of the Pine Tar Game at Retrosheet
 The Infamous Pine Tar Incident – Video at MLB.com
 Baseball's Best: The Pine Tar Game – Video at MLB.com

1983 in sports in New York City
1983 Major League Baseball season
Kansas City Royals
Major League Baseball controversies
Major League Baseball games
New York Yankees
July 1983 sports events in the United States